Johann Schelle (Geising, Erzgebirge, 6 September 1648 – Leipzig 10 March 1701) was a German Baroque composer.

From 1655 to 1657 he was a choirboy in Dresden and pupil of Heinrich Schütz. From 1657 to 1664 on Schütz's recommendation he was a singer in Wolfenbüttel. He was the cantor of the Thomanerchor, Leipzig, from 1677 to 1701.
In 1689/90 he collaborated on a cycle of chorale cantatas with Leipzig theologian Benedict Carpzov.

Leipzig
When his former teacher Sebastian Knüpfer died, Schelle succeeded him as Kantor of the Thomaskirche in Leipzig, a post later held by J.S. Bach. He obtained the post on January 31, 1677, and held it until his death. His appointment was made against the wishes of the city mayor, who remained antagonistic to him and the changes he introduced in the musical content of services. The matter came to a head when Schelle replaced the Latin compositions written by Italian masters with music to German texts, especially cantatas. When the city council finally took Schelle's side on the problem Schelle started the practice of introducing into the Protestant liturgy in Leipzig not only the Gospel cantata to German texts but later the chorale cantata, too. This remains one of his most important achievements.

Works, editions and recordings 
Over 200 compositions by Schelle are listed, but only 47 survive. During his life the only work printed was Christus ist des Gesetzes Ende, Leipzig 1684.

Recordings
Schelle: Actus Musicus auf Wey-Nachten Gundula Anders (soprano), Andreas Scholl (alto), Wilfried Jochens (tenor), Harry van der Kamp (bass). Musica Fiata, Roland Wilson. DHM.
Sacred Music by Johann Schelle, King's Consort. Hyperion Records
 "Actus Musicus auf Wey-Nachten" Christmas cantatas:  Monika Mauch, Myriam Arbouz,(soprano), Marian Dijkhuizen (alto),Georg Poplutz Jakob Pilgram (tenor), Raimonds Spogis (baritone), Concerto Palatino, Kölner Akademie, Michael Alexander Willens, CPO

References

1648 births
1701 deaths
German Baroque composers
German male classical composers
Thomaskantors
Pupils of Heinrich Schütz